

The Doman LZ-2A Pelican was an American five-seat helicopter designed and developed by Doman Helicopters of Danbury, Connecticut.

Design and development
Following the test flying of a Doman-designed rotor on a modified Sikorsky R-6 (designated the LZ-1A by Doman) the company developed a five-seat helicopter to use the rotor. Little information is available on the LZ-2A other than it was developed into the larger eight-seat Doman LZ-4, the LZ-4 was the first helicopter designed completely by the company which indicates that the LZ-2A was perhaps a further development of the Sikorsky-based LZ-1. The LZ-2A Pelican was powered by a  Franklin engine.

Specifications

References

Bibliography

1940s United States experimental aircraft
1940s United States helicopters
Single-engined piston helicopters
Aircraft first flown in 1949